Harold S. "Deacon" Duvall (January 11, 1917 – October 2, 2014) was an American football coach. He served as the head football coach at Fairmont State College—now known as Fairmont State University—in Fairmont, West Virginia from 1952 to 1971, compiling a record of 125–42–3. Duvall led the Fighting Falcons to the NAIA Football National Championship in 1967.

Duvall attended Fairmont Senior High School before moving on to Fairmont State College, from which he earned an A.B. degree. He later received a Master of Arts degree from Columbia University.

Head coaching record

References

1917 births
2014 deaths
Fairmont State Fighting Falcons football coaches
Fairmont State Fighting Falcons football players
High school football coaches in West Virginia
Columbia University alumni
Sportspeople from Fairmont, West Virginia
Coaches of American football from West Virginia
Players of American football from West Virginia